Urmila Tiwari is an Indian stage and television actress. She started her acting career from the age of 14 and was associated with Panorama Art Theatre and has done many shows in Prithvi and NCPA theaters till her first appearance on TV as an anchor for a game show channel Play TV.

Her work includes playing as the lead role in the TV serials like Hum Ladkiyan as Ajju. She was also part of 2025 Jaane Kya Hoga Aage as Neetika Joshi. She played the role of Dr. Priya in the show Dr. Madhumati on Duty and Pyaar Ka Dard Hai Meetha Meetha Pyaara Pyaara as Neha. She also worked in a comedy TV Serial aired on SAB TV Channel called Sajan Re Phir Jhoot Mat Bolo, where she played the role of Urmila. She also worked in Maddam Sir playing various characters.

References

Indian stage actresses
Actresses from Mumbai
Living people
Year of birth missing (living people)